Sluis-Aardenburg was a municipality in the province of Zeeland, in the south-western part of the Netherlands. It was created from a merger of Sluis and Aardenburg in 1995, and it merged with the municipality of Oostburg, on 1 January 2003, to form the new municipality of Sluis.  Sluis-Aardenburg covered an area of 83.48 km², of which 0.89 km² was water.

The municipality comprised the following towns, villages and townships:
Aardenburg
Draaiburg
Eede
Heille
Retranchement
Sint Anna ter Muiden
Sint Kruis
Sluis
Terhofstede
Zwindorp

References

Municipalities of the Netherlands established in 1995
Municipalities of the Netherlands disestablished in 2003
Former municipalities of Zeeland
Sluis